The Bellevue Park Railway, which closed in 1950, operated in Bellevue, Belfast.

History
Bellevue Park was a popular recreational facility between the two world wars, providing gardens, ponds, amusements, refreshments, a zoo, and a  gauge miniature railway for the entertainment of visitors. The Bellevue Park Railway, which received a new locomotive and carriages in 1933 from Blackpool, closed in 1950. The locomotive, a German-built  tender engine named 'Jean', was sold for scrap, but having been rescued by Sir William McAlpine eventually returned to its original railway, the Romney, Hythe and Dymchurch Railway in Kent, under its original name, 'The Bug'.

References

15 in gauge railways in Northern Ireland
Railway lines closed in 1950